Rue des Francs-Bourgeois is one of the longer streets in the Marais district of Paris, France.

Starting near Centre Georges Pompidou (rue Rambuteau), the road is considered trendy, with numerous fashion boutiques. Rue des Francs-Bourgeois is one of the few streets which largely ignores France's strong tradition of Sunday closure, even within Paris. As such, it is a popular location for weekend brunches and walks. Notable buildings include the ancient hôtels Carnavalet, Lamoignon, Sandreville, d'Albret, d'Alméras, Poussepin, de Coulanges, Hérouet, de Jaucourt, de Fontenay, de Breteuil and de Soubise. Hôtel Carnavalet houses the museum of the history of Paris.

History
The street was once known as the Rue des Poulies. In 1415, a noble called le Mazurier offered the Chief Prior of France a huge private mansion with 24 bedrooms to receive 48 poor people. These people were so poor that they didn't pay the taxes of the city, and were called francs-bourgeois. In 1868, the street was joined with Rue Neuve Saint-Catherine and Rue du Paradis au Marais.

References

External links

1868 establishments in France
Streets in the 3rd arrondissement of Paris
Streets in the 4th arrondissement of Paris
Le Marais